Selina is a given name.

Selina may also refer to:
Selina (genus), genus of beetles
Selina River, a river in Romania
Lake Selina, a lake in Tasmania
Selina, Sveti Lovreč, a village in Croatia